Riverfront station is a train station in Nashville, Tennessee, serving the Music City Star regional rail system. Located at 108 South 1st Avenue in Downtown Nashville near the John Seigenthaler Pedestrian Bridge, it serves as the western terminus for the line. No parking facilities are available at the station, however, connecting bus service is provided via MTA buses. It is within walking distance of Nissan Stadium via the previously mentioned John Seigenthaler Pedestrian Bridge.

The two bus lines servicing the station are Route 64 Star Downtown Shuttle and Route 93 Star West End Shuttle.

History
The site of the current station was originally home to a train depot built around 1902. The depot included a passenger station for the Tennessee Central Railway as well as several tracks used for freight service. Passenger service at the original station ended in 1955.

Site excavation for the new station began in 2004, but was delayed for several months due to the discovery of historic artifacts at the site, including the remains of a foundry. Construction of the new station began in August 2005. The design of the new station, which features post and beam architecture, was intended to evoke the feel of an Old World train station. Service at the station began on September 18, 2006.

References

External links

Music City Star website
Station from Google Maps Street View a

Music City Star stations
Transportation buildings and structures in Nashville, Tennessee
Railway stations in the United States opened in 2006
2006 establishments in Tennessee